King Lear is a 2018 British-American television film directed by Richard Eyre. An adaptation of the play of the same name by William Shakespeare, cut to just 115 minutes, was broadcast on BBC Two on 28 May 2018. Starring Anthony Hopkins as the title character, the adaptation is set in an alternative universe, 21st-century, highly militarised London and depicts the tragedy that follows when the sovereign King Lear announces the end of his reign and the division of his kingdom among his three daughters. The adaptation was met with positive reviews, which commended its acting and many singled out Hopkins for his performance in the title role.

Plot
Set in an alternative universe, 21st-century, highly militarised London, the sovereign King Lear calls his family together one evening in order for him to announce the division of his kingdom among his three daughters. The two elder daughters, Regan and Goneril, make open statements about their allegiance to and love for their father and receive each a share of the kingdom. The king's youngest daughter Cordelia, however, finds the act of making such a verbal statement superficial and declines to make a comparable declaration. As a result, she is refused her share of the inheritance, which is now entirely divided between her two elder sisters, and is left to her own devices to survive.

Goneril later accuses the retired King Lear of dotage. Regan accuses the king's retinue of being riotous.

Marriages
Duke of Albany marries Goneril.
Duke of Cornwall marries Regan.
King of France marries Cordelia.

Cast

Production
In October 2017, the BBC commissioned a new adaptation of the Shakespeare play in a co-production with Amazon Studios, starring Anthony Hopkins as the title character, with Emma Thompson, Emily Watson and Florence Pugh as his daughters. Filming began in the same month in Stevenage. A "first look" image was distributed in February 2018.

Scenes were also filmed in various locations in Dover, Kent, such as at Dover Castle, Samphire Hoe, and Abbot's Cliff.

Reception

Critical response
The website's critical consensus reads, "Led by dual mesmerizing performances from Sir Anthony Hopkins and Dame Emma Thompson and rounded out by a solidly stocked ensemble, this King Lear is a highly watchable adaptation." Metacritic, which uses a weighted average, assigned the film a normalized score of 76 out of 100, based on 6 critics, indicating "generally favorable reviews".

Sam Wollaston of The Guardian commended Hopkins' performance as Lear, deeming him "shouty, vulnerable and absolutely mesmerising" and wrote that "Shakespeare on television – a box it wasn't designed for and doesn't necessarily fit – isn't always successful. It only works if it's not just a play on the telly, but something in its own right, too, with its own identity. This one achieves that, with pace and modernity." The Wall Street Journal'''s John Anderson also commended Hopkins' performance, writing that he enjoyed watching him "gnash his teeth, wail and go gloriously mad opposite one of the best supporting casts imaginable."Vulture Matt Zoller Seitz praised the "terrific" cast and the story's sub-plots, writing "Eyre has cut the text to the bone, sometimes to its detriment, though the edits elevate the play's parallel, secondary story--the bastard Edmund (John McMillan) plotting against his father, the Earl of Gloucester (Jim Broadbent) and his half-brother Edgar (Andrew Scott)--in fascinating ways." Hanh Nguyen of IndieWire'' wrote that the adaptation "starts to break down near the last third with a choppiness that takes a toll on the logic of the piece" but commended the performances and stated "Amazon's King Lear is by no means a definitive adaptation of what is arguably the Bard's finest tragedy, but it is a thrilling and entertaining one."

Awards and nominations

References

External links
 
 
 
 

2018 television films
Amazon Studios films
British television films
BBC television dramas
Films based on King Lear
Amazon Prime Video original programming
Films directed by Richard Eyre
Films scored by Stephen Warbeck
2018 films